Steele Stebbins is an American actor. He is best known for his performance as Kevin Griswold, in the 2015 comedy film Vacation and as Wyatt, in the 2014 comedy film A Haunted House 2. In addition, he has appeared in two short films, Wish You Were (Here) in 2010 and Metered in 2011.

He also played a recurring character on Crazy Ex-Girlfriend as the youngest son of Paula Proctor, Tommy Proctor. He also appeared in Shane Dawson’s 2012 music video, The Vacation Song.

Filmography

Film

Television

Commercial

Philanthropy 
In 2016, Stebbins established a non-profit organization, Steele Stebbins Philanthropies, that is dedicated to engaging youth in philanthropy.

Awards
Won the Young Artist Awards 2016 leading actor award in a feature film (aged 11–13) for his role of Kevin Griswold in the feature film Vacation.

References

External links

Living people
American male film actors
American male television actors
21st-century American male actors
Year of birth missing (living people)
Male actors from Orange County, California
Place of birth missing (living people)